Nicholson County is one of the 141 Cadastral divisions of New South Wales. It contains the towns of Hillston, Goolgowi, Gunbar, Merriwagga, Goorawin and Langtree. The Lachlan River is its north-western boundary.

Nicholson County is named in honour of the statesman, Sir Charles Nicholson (1808-1903).

Parishes within this county
A full list of parishes found within this county; their current LGA and mapping coordinates to the approximate centre of each location is as follows:

References

Counties of New South Wales